Patrick Greil (born 8 September 1996) is an Austrian professional footballer who plays as an attacking midfielder for Rapid Wien.

Career
Greil is a product of the youth academies of ASK Salzburg, ASK Maxglan, Red Bull Salzburg, SV Wals-Grünau and Anif. He began his senior career with Anif in the Austrian Regionalliga in 2014. After 4 years with Anif and over 100 appearances, Greil transferred to Austria Klagenfurt in the 2. Liga on 12 June 2018. He played for seasons at Austria Klagenfurt, making over 100 appearances with them as well and helping them get promoted to the Austrian Football Bundesliga before leaving on a free transfer in the summer of 2022. 

He transferred to Rapid Wien on 24 May 2022, signing a contract until 2025.

Career statistics

References

External links
 
 OEFB Profile

1996 births
Living people
Austrian footballers
SK Rapid Wien players
SK Austria Klagenfurt players
USK Anif players
Austrian Football Bundesliga players
2. Liga (Austria) players
Austrian Regionalliga players
Association football midfielders